2006 ACC tournament may refer to:

 2006 ACC men's basketball tournament
 2006 ACC women's basketball tournament
 2006 ACC men's soccer tournament
 2006 ACC women's soccer tournament
 2006 Atlantic Coast Conference baseball tournament
 2006 Atlantic Coast Conference softball tournament